Hugh Pollard may refer to:
Hugh Pollard (actor) (born 1975), British child actor
Hugh Pollard (intelligence officer) (1888–1966), British intelligence officer
Hugh Pollard (sheriff) (fl. 1536, 1545), English sheriff in Devon, son of Lewis Pollard
Sir Hugh Pollard, 2nd Baronet (1603–1666), English soldier and MP
Hugh Pollard, founding principal of St Martin's College, Lancaster